David Nykl (born 7 February 1967) is a Czech-Canadian actor of film, television, commercials and theater. He is best known for portraying Dr. Radek Zelenka in the SyFy television series Stargate Atlantis and Anatoly Knyazev in the DC Comics series Arrow.

Early life and education
Nykl was born in Prague, Czechoslovakia, to a nurse mother and a structural engineer father. After the Soviet invasion in 1968, he and his family left then-Communist Czechoslovakia for Canada.  Upon arriving at Victoria, British Columbia, Nykl briefly attended the University of British Columbia, where he majored in liberal arts and marketing, but did not graduate.

Career
Nykl has appeared frequently in Vancouver and Prague in dozens of theater, film and television productions. Known for his versatility and depth as an actor, he has also produced theatre and film projects, and in 1994, he co-founded Prague's Misery Loves Company Theatre with Richard Toth and Ewan McLaren.

Nykl is known to science fiction fans as the recurring Stargate Atlantis character of Dr. Radek Zelenka, a Czech scientist on Earth's expedition to the "lost city" of Atlantis. His character is often seen working with the main scientist Dr. Rodney McKay, with their disagreements recurring throughout the series. He also played the role in the Stargate SG-1 episode "The Pegasus Project".

Nykl is fluent in Czech, English, French and Spanish. Though his character on Stargate Atlantis speaks English with a Czech accent, Nykl normally speaks with a Canadian accent.  Whenever Zelenka spoke Czech in Stargate Atlantis, Nykl was given the lines in English, and he translated them.

In 2012 he made a brief guest appearance on "Once Upon A Time" as dock man turned fish by evil Cora.

Personal life
He has three children: daughters Judi and Maddie, and son Sam.

Filmography

References

External links
 Official Site
 Letters from Pegasus
 

1967 births
Canadian male film actors
Canadian male stage actors
Canadian male television actors
Canadian people of Czech descent
Czechoslovak emigrants to Canada
Living people
Male actors from Prague
Male actors from Victoria, British Columbia
Naturalized citizens of Canada
University of British Columbia alumni